Ethylferrocene is an organoiron compound with the formula . It is a derivative of ferrocene containing an ethyl group on one of the two cyclopentadienyl rings.  Relative to the properties of ferrocene, its melting point is lower and its solubility of the compound in hydrocarbon solvents is improved.

Use and preparation
It was once used as an additive in rocket propellant, to promote the burning rate. It can be synthesized by the Clemmensen reduction of acetylferrocene.

References

Ferrocenes